The Second Grenoble Congress was the nineteenth national congress of the French Socialist Party (Parti socialiste or PS). It took place from November 24 to 26, 2000

Results

François Hollande was re-elected as First Secretary.

References

Congresses of the Socialist Party (France)
François Hollande
2000 in France
2000 in politics
2000 conferences
November 2000 events in France